New Burlington is a census-designated place (CDP) in Springfield Township, Hamilton County, Ohio, United States. The population was 5,049 at the 2020 census.

History
New Burlington was laid out by John Pegg in 1816.

Geography
U.S. Route 127 (Hamilton Avenue) is the main road through the area, running north towards Hamilton and south through Mount Healthy into downtown Cincinnati. Neighbors of New Burlington include Forest Park to the north, Greenhills to the east, Mount Healthy to the south, Northbrook to the southwest, and Mount Healthy Heights to the west.

References

Census-designated places in Hamilton County, Ohio
Census-designated places in Ohio